Jonathan "Jon" Richard Joannides (born 27 January 1958) is a former rally driver from Britain.

Career
He has raced at his local Rally GB seven times, and has been a co-driver once.

He was also a regular competitor in European Rally Championship competition, and was the Raliul Romaniei third-place finisher in 1994.

External links
 WRC Results (eWRC)

English rally drivers
1958 births
World Rally Championship drivers
Living people